Joachim Werner (19 July 1939 – 10 July 2010) was a German rower who specialized in the coxed four. In this event he won a European title in 1963 and a gold medal at the 1964 Summer Olympics.

References

1939 births
2010 deaths
Rowers from Berlin
Olympic rowers of the United Team of Germany
Rowers at the 1964 Summer Olympics
Olympic gold medalists for the United Team of Germany
Olympic medalists in rowing
West German male rowers
Medalists at the 1964 Summer Olympics
European Rowing Championships medalists
20th-century German people